Omkring tiggarn från Luossa (Around the beggar from Luossa) is a poem by the Swedish proletarian author Dan Andersson. Its nine four-line verses, with a ABAB rhyming scheme, create a picture of longing for something beyond the visible world. The poem was published in his 1917 poetry collection Svarta ballader (Black Ballads). It has become well-known through popular recordings by musicians including the Hootenanny Singers, and Sofia Karlsson.

Context 

Dan Andersson (1888–1920) was a proletarian author, poet, and composer from Grangärde in the rural Dalarna region of Sweden. He was brought up in poverty, the son of a teacher. As a young man, Andersson worked as a charcoal burner and then as a shoemaker. In 1912, the family moved to a cottage named Luossa near . From 1914, he published several books of poems including the 1917 Svarta ballader (Black Ballads); he had such difficulty finding a publisher that he accepted Albert Bonniers Förlag's offer of 25 copies of the book as his sole payment. The book has become one of the most important in 20th century Swedish literature. He died of accidental cyanide poisoning in a hotel in Stockholm. Posthumously, he became one of the most popular Swedish poets.

Poem 

"Omkring tiggarn från Luossa" (Around the Beggar from Luossa) is a poem of nine verses, each of four lines, published in Svarta Ballader; the rhyming scheme is ABAB. The journalist and poet Göran Greider describes it as difficult to analyse, calling Andersson a romantic and his words more like "pictures and revelations" than straightforward descriptions. He compares the poem to the songs of Bob Dylan, stating that while the audience may not know the exact meaning of his 1965 song "Mr. Tambourine Man", they instinctively feel it is excellent work.

The author Gösta Ågren stated in his 1971 book Kärlek som i allting bor that the French poet Charles Baudelaire had been an important influence on "Omkring tiggarn från Luossa". Andersson had bought a copy of Baudelaire's 1857 Les Fleurs du mal in January 1917, and translated some of Baudelaire's poetry, including Moesta et Errabunda. His early death in 1920 prevented the completion of his translation project of Les fleurs du mal.

The author and Swedish Academy member Lotta Lotass has described "Omkring tiggarn från Luossa" as the key poem in the whole of Anderson's work. The poem has become well-known both as a text and through popular recordings by different musicians. Jimmy Ginsby, director of the Dan Andersson Society, calls the poem one of the most loved of Andersson's works, stating that it is open and free of traditional religion, though sings of "something beyond the mountains", something that everyone knows. English translations of several of Andersson's poems, including "Omkring tiggarn från Luossa", have been published by Åke Helgesson and Caroline Schleef, and by John Irons.

Song 

The singer Gunnar Turesson noted in his 1976 book Visor och skaldeminnen that Andersson had emphasised that "Omkring tiggarn från Luossa" should "be read and not sung". Despite this, the poem has repeatedly been set to music and recorded as a song. 
In 1938, the composer  set it as a "melodrama for orchestra". 
The poem was set to music by the Swedish singer and musician  in 1954, re-released on his 1963 album Dan Anderssons Dikter Och Visor. From November 1972, the version by the Hootenanny Singers reached second place in the Swedish Svensktoppen charts, and remained listed there for 52 weeks. The ABBA musician Björn Ulvaeus, who had been in the Hootenanny Singers, stated that the song had probably been their biggest hit, coming to his mind when his bandmate Hansi Schwartz died.

In 1979, the composer David Grufman published a new setting of the poem in his book of musical scores Äppelblom elva dikter.
 performed it on his 1988 album Dan Andersson. In 2000, the poet and musician Ulf Lundell recorded the song on his album .

Greider wrote that the song was so familiar in Sweden that towards the end of the 20th century, performances had become standard and traditional with little innovation. He noted that his father had requested the song for his funeral, and that it was among the most often sung of Swedish songs. In Greider's view, perception of the song changed when Sofia Karlsson performed it on her bestselling 2005 album Svarta ballader. He stated that Karlsson's "small but unbelievably nuanced and playful voice swept away much old dust from [Andersson's] songs", describing her version of "Omkring tiggarn från Luossa" as very rapid and gently genial. This won her the 2008 .

References

External links 

 Song text on WikiSource
 English translation at LyricsTranslate

1917 poems
Swedish poems
Dan Andersson